Elizabeth Oshoba is a Nigerian boxer. She participated in the 2022 Commonwealth Games in the Featherweight division and won a silver medal .

References 

Living people
Boxers at the 2022 Commonwealth Games
Commonwealth Games competitors for Nigeria
1999 births
Commonwealth Games silver medallists for Nigeria
Commonwealth Games medallists in boxing
21st-century Nigerian women
Medallists at the 2022 Commonwealth Games